Aseri is a small borough in Viru-Nigula Parish, Lääne-Viru County, in northeastern Estonia. As of 2011 Census, the settlement's population was 1,439, of which the Estonians were 506 (35.2%).

Notable people
  (1903–2000), artist
 Sulev Oll (born 1964), journalist

References

Boroughs and small boroughs in Estonia